The National Personal Training Institute is a private for-profit school with multiple locations in the United States that provide students with the education and training to become certified personal trainers. It is a 500 or 600 hour-long program that can be completed within 4, 6 or 12 months.  The course covers roughly 100 hours of exercise program design, 100 hours of nutrition, 100 hours of anatomy and physiology, and 200 hours of practical experience. A part of each day is spent in a classroom setting learning the academic information and the remainder of each day is spent in a gym setting learning the practical aspects of personal training and actually working out.

The school is approved by the Department of Education in the states that they operate in.  The school was founded by Gene McIlvaine in April 2001 with four schools; there are currently over 30 schools nationwide.  The headquarters is in Philadelphia, Pennsylvania.  Upon graduation students receive a diploma in personal training that does not expire, with the title of CPT (Certified Personal Trainer), they are Certified in Basic Nutrition, and they are certified in CPR/AED and First Aid.  Successful completion of the class also makes a student eligible to take the National Academy of Sports Medicine Certification. Ten NPTI school locations now offer federal financial aid.

References

Exercise organizations